Uneasy Terms is a 1948 British crime thriller film directed by Vernon Sewell and starring Michael Rennie, Moira Lister and Faith Brook. It is based on the 1946 novel of the same name by Peter Cheyney.

Premise
Slim Callaghan is a private eye whose client, Colonel Stenhurst, is murdered, leaving behind a trail of suspects. Viola, the eldest of the Colonel's three stepdaughters, is the prime suspect, but after wading through clues and romance, Callaghan corners the real culprit.

Cast
 Michael Rennie as Slim Callaghan
 Moira Lister as Corinne Alardyse 
 Faith Brook as Viola Alardyse 
 Joy Shelton as Effie 
 Patricia Goddard as Patricia Alardyse 
 Barry Jones as Inspector Gringall 
 Marie Ney as Honoria Wymering 
 Paul Carpenter as Windy Nicholls 
 Nigel Patrick as Lucien Donnelly 
 Sydney Tafler as Maysin 
 J.H. Roberts as Sallins 
 Joan Carroll as Matron

Reception
Allmovie wrote, "Uneasy Terms is a scrambled British attempt at American-style hard boil."
Sky Movies wrote, "Peter Cheyney's detective Slim Callaghan has rarely translated well to the screen, But this Vernon Sewell-directed thriller is one of the better efforts, thanks largely to a quality cast that also includes Barry Jones, Joy Shelton and Paul Carpenter."

References

External links

1948 films
Films directed by Vernon Sewell
British thriller films
1940s thriller films
Films set in London
Films based on British novels
British black-and-white films
Films shot at British National Studios
1940s English-language films
1940s British films